Opostegoides auriptera is a moth of the family Opostegidae. It was described by Puplesis and Robinson in 1999, and is known from Thailand.

External links

Opostegidae
Moths described in 1999